The Wooden Box may refer to 
 The Wooden Box (album), a box set of Opeth's first three albums
 The Wooden Box (film), 2006 Spanish-Portuguese black comedy film
 "The Wooden Box", a 2003 episode of Grand Designs

See also
 Wooden box, a kind of wooden container